The following is a timeline of the history of the city of Bakersfield, California, USA.

Prior to 20th century

 1873 – City of Bakersfield incorporated.
 1888 – Bakersfield and Kern Electric Railway begins operating.
 1889
 July 7: Great Bakersfield Fire of 1889.
 Oil discovered.
 Bakersfield (Southern Pacific station) opens.

20th century

 1904 – Beale Memorial Clock Tower built.
 1907 – The Bakersfield Californian newspaper in publication.
 1910 – Kern becomes part of Bakersfield.
 1921 – Central Park established.
 1928 – Kern County Chamber of Commerce Building and Padre Hotel constructed.
 1929 – Hart Park opens.
 1930 – Fox Theater in business.
 1945 – Kern County Museum opens.
 1952 –
 July 21 – The 7.3  Kern County earthquake affected the southern San Joaquin Valley with a maximum Mercalli intensity of XI (Extreme), killing 12 and injuring hundreds in the region.
 August 22 – A 5.8  aftershock affected Bakersfield with a maximum Mercalli intensity of VIII (Severe), killing two and causing an additional $10 million in damage.
 1954 – Bakersfield City Hall built.
 1955 – Memorial Stadium opens.
 1961 – Sister city relationship established with Wakayama, Japan.
 1962 – Bakersfield News Bulletin begins publication.
 1963 – Crest Drive-In cinema in business.
 1964 – Goodwill thrift shop in business.
 1965 – Community Action Partnership of Kern established.
 1976 – Bakersfield Department of Water Resources established.
 1977
 December: Great Bakersfield Dust Storm of 1977.
 Mesa Marin Raceway opens.
 1980 – California Living Museum (zoo) founded.
 1983 – County Food Bank established.
 1990
 Hindu Temple of Kern County founded.
 Population: 174,820.
 1996 – Buck Owens Crystal Palace (music hall) opens.
 2000
 Bakersfield (Amtrak station) opens.
 Population: 247,057.

21st century

 2001 – Harvey Hall becomes mayor.
 2006 – River Walk Park opens.
 2007
 Kern Veterans Memorial unveiled.
 Kevin McCarthy becomes U.S. representative for California's 22nd congressional district.
 2009
 Mill Creek linear park opens.
 Bakersfield 16 Cinema in business.
 2013 – Kern County Raceway Park opens.

See also
 Bakersfield, California history
 Timelines of other cities in the Southern California area of California: Anaheim, Long Beach, Los Angeles, Riverside, San Bernardino, San Diego, Santa Ana

References

Bibliography

External links

 
 Items related to Bakersfield, various dates (via Digital Public Library of America).

 
bakersfield